Denizköy (literally "sea village") is a village in Dikili district of İzmir Province, Turkey. It is situated on the Aegean Sea side. The population of the village is 275 as of 2020.

References

Villages in Dikili District